Bembrops gobioides, the goby flathead, is a species of fish in the family Percophidae. It is found in the western Atlantic Ocean from New York to the Caribbean Sea.

References

 
Fish described in 1880